Elections to the French National Assembly was held in the territory of Ivory Coast (which included Upper Volta at the time) on 10 November 1946 as part of the wider parliamentary elections. Félix Houphouët-Boigny, Zinda Kaboré and Daniel Ouezzin Coulibaly were elected on the African Democratic Rally list.

Results

References

Ivory
1946 in French Upper Volta
1946 in Ivory Coast
Elections in Burkina Faso
Elections in Ivory Coast